This is a list of graphical methods with a mathematical basis.
Included are diagram techniques, chart techniques, plot techniques, and other forms of visualization.

There is also a list of computer graphics and descriptive geometry topics.

Simple displays
Area chart
Box plot
Dispersion fan diagram
Graph of a function
Logarithmic graph paper
Heatmap
Histogram
Bar chart
Line chart
Pie chart
Plotting
Scatterplot
Sparkline
Stemplot
Radar chart

Set theory
Venn diagram
Karnaugh diagram

Descriptive geometry
Isometric projection
Orthographic projection
Perspective (graphical)

Engineering drawing
Technical drawing
Graphical projection
Mohr's circle
Pantograph
Circuit diagram
Smith chart
Sankey diagram

Systems analysis
Binary decision diagram
Control-flow graph
Functional flow block diagram
Information flow diagram
IDEF
N2 chart
Sankey diagram
State diagram
System context diagram
Data-flow diagram

Cartography
Map projection
Orthographic projection (cartography)
Robinson projection
Stereographic projection
Dymaxion map
Topographic map
Craig retroazimuthal projection
Hammer retroazimuthal projection

Biological sciences
Cladogram
Punnett square
Systems Biology Graphical Notation

Physical sciences
Free body diagram
Greninger chart
Phase diagram
Wavenumber-frequency diagram
Bode plot
Nyquist plot
Dalitz plot
Feynman diagram
Carnot Plot

Business methods
Flowchart
Workflow
Gantt chart
Growth-share matrix (often called BCG chart)
Work breakdown structure
Control chart
Ishikawa diagram
Pareto chart (often used to prioritise outputs of an Ishikawa diagram)

Conceptual analysis
Mind mapping
Concept mapping
Conceptual graph
Entity-relationship diagram
Tag cloud, also known as word cloud

Statistics

Autocorrelation plot
Bar chart
Biplot
Box plot
Bullet graph
Chernoff faces
Control chart
Fan chart
Forest plot
Funnel plot
Galbraith plot
Histogram
Mosaic plot
Multidimensional scaling
np-chart
p-chart
Pie chart
Probability plot
Normal probability plot
Poincaré plot
Probability plot correlation coefficient plot
Q–Q plot
Rankit
Run chart
Seasonal subseries plot
Scatter plot
Skewplot
Ternary plot
Recurrence plot
Waterfall chart
Violin plot

Machine Learning
Hinton Diagram

Other
Ulam spiral
Nomogram
Fitness landscape
Weather map
Predominance diagram
One-line diagram
Autostereogram
Edgeworth box
Lineweaver-Burk diagram
Eadie-Hofstee diagram
Population pyramid
Parametric plot
Causality loop diagram
Ramachandran plot
V model
Sentence diagram
Tree structure
Treemapping
Airfield traffic pattern diagram

See also
List of information graphics software

External links
 A periodic table of visualization methods.
 Speaking of Graphics.

Graphical methods

 
Graphical methods